Louth v Diprose, is an Australian contract law and equity case, in which unconscionable conduct is considered.

Facts
Solicitor Louis Donald Diprose (the plaintiff/respondent) was infatuated with Carol Mary Louth (the defendant/appellant), whom he had met in Launceston, Tasmania in 1981. He showered her with gifts and, at one time, proposed to her; she, however, refused. Subsequently in 1985 the defendant informed the plaintiff that she was depressed and was going to be evicted and, if this happened, she would commit suicide (this was largely untrue). In response, the plaintiff agreed to buy her a house and, at her insistence, put it in her name. In 1988 when their relationship deteriorated, the plaintiff asked the defendant to transfer the house into his name. She refused and he brought proceedings seeking to recover the house.

At the trial in the Supreme Court of South Australia, the court of first instance, the plaintiff won, with King CJ holding that for the defendant to retain the house and land would be unconscionable and thus the plaintiff was beneficially entitled to the land. The defendant subsequently appealed to the Full Court of South Australia again, however, the defendant lost on appeal, with Jacobs  and Legoe J forming the majority and Matheson J dissenting. The defendant then filed special leave for an appeal to the High Court of Australia, which was granted.

Judgment
The appeal was dismissed. The property in Tranmere, South Australia, which was purchased by the plaintiff but placed in the name of the defendant, remained recovered from the defendant to the plaintiff.

Impact
Louth v Diprose remains an important case in Australian contract law and equity and extending the scope of unconscionable conduct, from Commercial Bank of Australia Ltd v Amadio.<ref>{{cite thesis |last=O'Shea |first=G.N. |year=2010 |url=https://opus.lib.uts.edu.au/handle/10453/20384 |title=The Extent to Which Unconscionability at General Law, the Special Equity in Garcia and Part IVA of the Trade Practices Act 1974 (Cth) Are Available to a Debtor or Guarantor When a Finance Provider Seeks to Enforce a Security [S.J.D. thesis] |publisher=University of Technology, Sydney|type=Thesis }}</ref> Accordingly, it is taught in most, if not all, Australian law schools as part of introductory, substantive contracts, and substantive equity classes.

Furthermore, Louth v Diprose'' has been studied in academia. The purportedly limited presentation of the appellant's case has been noted.

References

1992 in Australian law
1992 in case law
Australian contract case law
High Court of Australia cases